Craig Millar (born 29 October 1990) is a New Zealand-born Japanese rugby union player who currently plays as a loosehead prop for  in New Zealand's domestic Mitre 10 Cup and previously for the Tokyo based Super Rugby franchise the Sunwolves.

Early career

Millar is a native of the Otago region in New Zealand's South Island, having been born and raised in the city of Dunedin.   He attended the prestigious Otago Boys' High School in his hometown where he played first XV rugby before going on to study accounting at the University of Otago.   After graduating, he split his time working as an accountant with building a rugby career, initially playing for Pirates in Otago's local club rugby competition.

Senior career

Otago and Millar were again in fine form in 2016, with the Razorbacks finishing top of the Championship log and making it all the way to the playoff final before being surprisingly defeated at home by  while Millar was once again an ever-present playing 12 times, 9 of which were from the start and contributing a career high 3 season tries.

Super Rugby

He made 4 substitute appearances during his first campaign with the Highlanders, not a bad return as he spent the year as the franchise's third choice loosehead behind the more experienced Kane Hames and Chris King.

Unfortunately for him, all the momentum he had built up in his career through 2013 and the early part of 2014 came to a grinding halt when injury ruled him out of the 2014 New Zealand domestic season and the 2015 Super Rugby season, meaning that Millar would play no part in the Highlanders maiden Super Rugby triumph.   He did, however, make a comeback with Otago in the second half of 2015 which earned him a recall to the Highlanders wider training group for the 2016 season and this time serving as back up to Daniel Lienert-Brown and Brendon Edmonds, he managed another 4 substitute appearances.

Tony Brown replaced the  bound Jamie Joseph as Highlanders head-coach ahead of the 2017 Super Rugby season and having worked with Millar before at provincial level, he saw fit to promote him to the franchise's senior squad ahead of his first campaign in charge.

Jamie Joseph announced ahead of the 2018 Super Rugby season that Millar will join his Sunwolves squad alongside several former Highlanders teammates.

Super Rugby Statistics

References

External links

1990 births
Living people
New Zealand rugby union players
Rugby union props
Otago rugby union players
Highlanders (rugby union) players
Rugby union players from Dunedin
People educated at Otago Boys' High School
University of Otago alumni
Sunwolves players
Saitama Wild Knights players
Japan international rugby union players